This is a list of districts in the London Borough of Hillingdon organised as a table by settlement sufficiently notable to meet WP:Notability and of all separately named neighbourhoods:

Notes and references
Notes 
  
References

Lists of places in London